Typhoon Kathleen was a typhoon that approached Japan in September 1947. Kathleen brought record heavy rain at the time, causing major destruction in the Kanto region.

Meteorological history

Kathleen struck the Boso Peninsula and the entire Kanto Region in Japan on September 15. Frontal activity, which had been stagnant in the vicinity of Japan due to the typhoon, became active, causing heavy rainfall in the Kanto and Tohoku regions.

Impact 

Heavy rains caused the Arakawa River and Tone River to overflow. The areas of Tokyo, Gunma, Saitama, Tochigi, Ibaraki and Chiba suffered severe flood damage. In Gunma and Tochigi prefectures, debris flow and flooding of rivers occurred one after another, resulting in more than 1,100 deaths and missing persons in both prefectures. Also, in the Tohoku region, the Kitakami River flooded, causing major damage at Ichinoseki City in Iwate Prefecture. 

The resulting floods killed 1,077 people and left 853 people missing.

Aftermath

There is a memorial built for the victims of typhoon at Kazo City, Saitama Prefecture.

References 

1940s Pacific typhoon seasons
Typhoons in Japan
1947 in Japan